Tmesisternus heurni is a species of beetle in the family Cerambycidae. It was described by Bernhard Schwarzer in 1924. It is known from Papua New Guinea.

References

heurni
Beetles described in 1924